Marku is an Albanian surname. Notable people with the surname include:

 Albion Marku (born 2000), Albanian footballer
 Antonio Marku (born 1992), Albanian footballer
 Florian Marku (born 1996), Albanian boxer
 Herald Marku (born 1996), Albanian footballer
 Jimmy Marku (born 1974),  Albanian-born British strongman competitor
 Kristi Marku (born 1995), Albanian footballer
 Mark Marku (born 1991), Albanian singer
 Mark Marku (politician), Albanian politician
 Rovena Marku (born 1987), Albanian swimmer
 Taulant Marku (born 1994), Albanian footballer

See also 
 Marcus (name)

Albanian-language surnames